Václav Hanka (also written as Wenceslaus Hanka) (10 June 1791 – 12 January 1861) was a Czech philologist.

Biography
Hanka was born at Hořiněves near Hradec Králové. He was sent in 1807 to school at Hradec Králové, to escape the conscription, then to the University of Prague, where he founded a society for the cultivation of the Czech language. At Vienna, where he afterwards studied law, he established a Czech periodical; and in 1813 he made the acquaintance of Josef Dobrovský, an eminent philologist.

On 16 September 1817 Hanka claimed that he had discovered some manuscripts of 13th- and 14th-century Bohemian poems in the church tower of the town of Dvůr Králové nad Labem and later some more at Zelená Hora Castle near Nepomuk. The Manuscripts of Dvůr Králové and Zelená Hora were made public in 1818, with a German translation by Swoboda. The originals were presented by him to newly founded National Museum at Prague, of which he was appointed librarian in the same year. Great doubt, however, was felt as to their genuineness, and Dobrovský, by pronouncing the latter manuscript (also known as The Judgment of Libuše), to be an obvious fraud, confirmed the suspicion. Some years afterwards Dobrovský saw fit to modify his decision, but modern Czech scholars regard the manuscript as a forgery. A translation into English, The Manuscript of the Queen's Court, was made by Albert Henry Wratislaw in 1852.

In 1846 Hanka edited the Reims Gospel and made it available to the general public, for which he received the cross of the Order of St. Anna by the Tsar Nicholas I and a brilliant ring by Emperor Ferdinand I.

In 1848 Hanka, who was an ardent pan-Slavist, took part at the Prague Slavic Congress, 1848 and other peaceful national demonstrations, being the founder of the political society  ("Slavonic Linden"). He was elected to the Imperial Diet at Vienna, but declined to take his seat. In the winter of 1848 he became lecturer and in 1849 professor of Slavonic languages in the University of Prague.

He died in Prague on 12 January 1861.

Works
His chief works and editions are the following:
Hankowy Pjsne (Prague, 1815), a volume of poems
Starobyla Skiadani (1817–1826), in 5 vols, a collection of old Bohemian poems, chiefly from unpublished manuscripts
A Short History of the Slavonic Peoples (1818)
A Bohemian Grammar (1822)
A Polish Grammar (1839) (these two grammars were composed on a plan suggested by Dobrovský)
Igor (1821), an ancient Russian epic, with a translation into Bohemian
a part of the Gospels from the Reims manuscript in the Glagolitic alphabet (1846)
the old Bohemian Chronicles of Delimit (1848)
History of Charles IV, by Procop Luph (1848)
Evangelium Ostromis (1853)
Hanka also composed the song Moravo, Moravo!, sometimes used as a Moravian national anthem.

Notes

Further reading

 
Die ältesten Denkmäler der böhmischen Sprache, Prag 1840, 
Václav Hanka, Josef Linda: Manuscript of the Queen's Court: A Collection of Old Bohemian Lyrico-epic ..., 1852 
Albert Henry Wratislaw: The Queen's Court Manuscript, with Other Ancient Bohemian Poems., 1852, 

1791 births
1861 deaths
People from Hradec Králové District
People from the Kingdom of Bohemia
Czech philologists
Czech poets
Czech male poets
Czech fraudsters
Charles University alumni
Corresponding members of the Saint Petersburg Academy of Sciences
Eastern Orthodox Christians from the Czech Republic
Burials at Vyšehrad Cemetery